Jaqueline Cristian and Elena-Gabriela Ruse were the defending champions, but both players chose not to participate.

Lu Jiajing and You Xiaodi won the title, defeating Paula Kania-Choduń and Katarina Zavatska in the final, 6–3, 6–4.

Seeds

Draw

Draw

References
Main Draw

Engie Open Andrézieux-Bouthéon 42 - Doubles